Thallarcha epicela is a moth of the subfamily Arctiinae first described by Turner in 1922. It is found in Australia.

References

Lithosiini
Moths described in 1922